Sokmanabad Rural District is in Safayyeh District of Khoy County, West Azerbaijan province, Iran. At the National Census of 2006, its population was 13,012 in 2,525 households. There were 11,808 inhabitants in 2,895 households at the following census of 2011. At the most recent census of 2016, the population of the rural district was 11,325 in 3,014 households. The largest of its 42 villages was Zaviyeh, with 1,640 people. The district is named after Sökmen II.

References 

Khoy County

Rural Districts of West Azerbaijan Province

Populated places in West Azerbaijan Province

Populated places in Khoy County